Katyusha's Song, or "Song of Katyusha" (Japanese language:カチューシャの唄, Kachūsha no Uta) is a Japanese song, which was highly popular in early 20th century Japan. It was composed in the major pentatonic scale by Shinpei Nakayama with lyrics by Soeda Azenbō. The song was sung by Matsui Sumako in a dramatization of Leo Tolstoy's 1899 novel Resurrection, first put on stage in 1914 in Tokyo.

Influences
Katyusha's song became a national hit in Japan from 1913 onwards, selling 27,000 copies and was taken on by street corner musicians throughout the Japanese empire. It is considered by some music historians as the first example of modern Japanese popular music.

External links

References

Japanese songs
Songs written by Shinpei Nakayama